In enzymology, a glyceraldehyde-3-phosphate dehydrogenase (NAD(P)+) is an enzyme that catalyzes the chemical reaction

D-glyceraldehyde 3-phosphate + phosphate + NAD(P)+  3-phospho-D-glyceroyl phosphate + NAD(P)H + H+

The 4 substrates of this enzyme are D-glyceraldehyde 3-phosphate, phosphate, NAD+, and NADP+, whereas its 4 products are 3-phospho-D-glyceroyl phosphate, NADH, NADPH, and H+.

This enzyme belongs to the family of oxidoreductases, specifically those acting on the aldehyde or oxo group of donor with NAD+ or NADP+ as acceptor.  The systematic name of this enzyme class is D-glyceraldehyde 3-phosphate:NAD(P)+ oxidoreductase (phosphorylating). Other names in common use include (phosphorylating), triosephosphate dehydrogenase (NAD(P)), and glyceraldehyde-3-phosphate dehydrogenase (NAD(P)) (phosphorylating).

Structural studies

As of late 2007, only one structure has been solved for this class of enzymes, with the PDB accession code .

References

 P. Mathis (Ed.), Photosynthesis: From Light to Biosphere, vol. 1, Kluwer Academic Publishers, 1995, p. 959-962.
 

EC 1.2.1
NADPH-dependent enzymes
NADH-dependent enzymes
Enzymes of known structure